Ganesh and Kumaresh are Indian duo of violin players who are a part of the Carnatic music (South India) fraternity. The brothers are known as modern contemporary artists in "Sastriya Sangitam". They were awarded the Sangeet Natak Akademi Award for 2018 for Carnatic Instrumental Music (Violin). Kumaresh's wife, Jayanthi Kumaresh, is a noted Veena player.

Early life
Ganesh and Kumaresh were born in Kanpur, Uttar Pradesh in 1964 and 1967 respectively, where their father Sri T.S. Rajagopalan was employed in Life Insurance Corporation of India. Their musical training started at home at the early ages of 3 & 2 respectively, under their father, who also taught other students in the neighborhood.

Music career
Ganesh and Kumaresh, apart from performing, they also score music for films and dance productions. They played music for the movies Dance like a Man and Chandrikai. Their own musical form raga pravaham brings out the intricacies of the Indian ragam and thalam.

They have performed at several global festivals in countries and regions including India, the USA, Canada, Germany, France, Belgium, Switzerland, the Middle East, Southeast Asia, Maldives, and Australia.

They also appeared in Doordarshan Bharati's musical clip advertisement for national unity along with veterans in music, sports and various fields (as the national representatives of their respective field).

Discography
 Colours of India
 Navarasa
 Shadjam
 Aksharam
 Carnatic Chills
 Expressions
 Samarpan
 Brahmma
 Seasons
 Aditya
 Vasantham
 Bowing with Passion

Music Singles
 Milky way
 Flights of Anjaneya
 Modi
 Begada
 Nalinakanti

Awards

Sangeet Natak Akademi Award 2018
Academy of Music Chowdiah Award for the year 2016
 Asthana Vidwans of the Sri Matam of Kanchi Kamakoti Peetam and Sringeri Sharada Madhom.
 Dwaram Venkata Swami Naidu award
 Titles: Kalaimamani, Sunaada Sironmani, Sangeetha Saragnya, "Sarasahana Praveena" and many more.

Views of other artists

Ustad Zakir Hussain: The duos were child prodigies who started performing before they entered the age of ten. Since then they have entered the ranks of the great living performers of IndianMusic. I have performed with Ganesh Kumaresh in the USA and Europe as well as in India. They are creative in their performances and their style includes a unique touch that expresses every emotion in the raga. They have remarkable stage presence and enthrall the audiences with their performances.

Dr. Balamuralikrishna: Ganesh and Kumaresh are very accomplished musicians who have contributed to the enrichment of Indian style of violin playing. Their style of music bridges the gap between the young and old and opens up fresh ideas and avenues of creativity.

A.R. Rahman: "After traveling extensively to four countries when I come back to Chennai I am often asked why I choose to live here? The reason is simple because my house is here  and Ganesh and Kumaresh are here." So said A.R Rahman as he launched the new age violin album "Carnatic chills" brought out by Ganesh Kumaresh.(Deccan chronicle 12 February 2007)

M.S. Gopalakrishnan: Music fraternity knows the great living legend Shri M.S.Gopalakrishnan did inimitable Tapas on the art of mastering to play the violin. He was the first person to perfect a style to perform both the branches of Indian Sastriya Sangitam.  He declares the young brothers as the best duo of the present generation.

Isaignani Ilayaraja: This made the "Isaignani Ilayaraja" who was also present on the occasion (see the photograph below), to tell the brothers, what better encomiums they could look forward. He compared the occasion to that of Brahmarishi Vasishtar conferring the title of "Brahmarishi" on Maharishi Viswamitra.

Until recently all instrumentalists have been emulating faithfully what the vocal musicians performed in the popularly known gayaki style. Each instrument has its place of originality, individuality and limitations. Introduction of violin to Sastriya Sangitam has brought about a drastic change inasmuch as this instrument could surpass the melodic skeins, contents and possibilities.  Ragapravaham, the brain child of these young brothers has over a short period of time become an instant hit all over the world. It is nothing but elaborating the traditional ragas, unfathoming their hypnotising melodic contents.  Embracing and  encompassing the other brotherly western instruments, like the Guitar, keyboard, drum  in addition to the traditional Mridangam, Kanchira, Ghatam etc. Ragapravaham has caught the imagination of the youth in a big way.

In 1983, M.G. Ramachandran, the former Chief minister of Tamil Nadu, has occasion to hear a television concert of the gifted brothers. He was so moved by their talent and accomplishment that he sent them a personal note of appreciation. He wrote, "I was wonderstruck with your talent. My hearty greetings to both of you. I am sure you will reach greater heights in your career." He subsequently made them State Artistes of Tamil Nadu.

References

Carnatic violinists
Indian musical duos
Recipients of the Sangeet Natak Akademi Award